The Saki animated television series is based on the manga of the same name written and illustrated by Ritz Kobayashi. The episodes were produced by the animation studios Gonzo and Picture Magic, directed by Manabu Ono, and written by Tatsuhiko Urahata. The story follows the titular character Saki Miyanaga, a skilled mahjong player who joins her high school's mahjong club despite previously hating the game. There, she makes friends with other mahjong players and heads into the world of competitive mahjong. The episodes aired in Japan between April 6 and September 28, 2009 on TV Tokyo and concluded with 25 episodes. The first DVD compilation volume was released on July 15, 2009 by Pony Canyon. The DVD release also included seven picture drama episodes.

An anime television adaptation of Saki Achiga-hen episode of Side-A, a side-story manga written by Kobayashi and illustrated by Aguri Igarashi, was produced by Studio Gokumi and directed by Ono. The story follows Nodoka Haramura's former classmate, Shizuno Takakamo, who revives her school's mahjong club so they can reach the national championships and see Nodoka again. The 12-episode series aired in Japan between April 9 and July 2, 2012 and was simulcast by Crunchyroll. Four additional episodes aired between December 2012 and May 2013. A third season, Saki: The Nationals, also produced by Studio Gokumi, aired 13 episodes between January 5 and April 6, 2014. All of the series are simulcast by Crunchyroll. An original video animation based on Saya Kiyoshi's Saki Biyori gag manga was released on July 25, 2015.

Five pieces of theme music are used for Saki; two opening themes and three ending themes. The opening theme for episodes one through fourteen is "Glossy:MMM" by Miyuki Hashimoto, while episodes fifteen onwards use "Bloooomin'" by Little Non. For Saki Achiga-hen episode of Side-A, the opening theme is "Miracle Rush" by StylipS, while the ending themes are "Square Panic Serenade" performed by Aoi Yūki, Nao Tōyama, Kana Hanazawa, Mako and Yumi Uchiyama and "Futuristic Player" by Miyuki Hashimoto. For the extra episodes, the opening theme is "Tsu Ba Sa" by SylipS.

Saki (2009)
This season of Saki featured the Kiyosumi girls' campaign to qualify for the National mahjong tournament in the Nagano prefecture.  As the Kiyosumi team qualified one tournament level after another, they meet and play various other schools along the way, notably perennial school Kazekoshi, the current prefectural champion Ryūmonbuchi, and a relatively unknown school Tsuruga in the prefectural final.

Saki Achiga-hen episode of Side-A (2012)
One of Nodoka's various school transfers influenced a group of girls in the Nara region to form a team and compete in the National mahjong tournament.  Together, these five girls revive the defunct Achiga Girls Academy mahjong club.  Aided by a former member of the prefectural champion team, Harue Akado, the team trains and battles their way to the National semi-final, with the hope of making the finals and playing Nodoka again.

Saki: The Nationals (2014) 

A third series shows the Kiyosumi team at the National tournament, during their quarterfinal matches with a short lead up to this point.  The other teams facing Kiyosumi are also featured.

Saki Biyori (2015 OVA)
Based on the manga spin-off by Saya Kiyoshi, Saki Biyori is a gag series following the everyday lives of the series' characters.

References

External links
Official Saki anime website 

Lists of anime episodes